Ragnar Omtvedt (18 February 1890–31 March 1975) was a Norwegian born, American Olympic skier.

Career
Ragnar Omtvedt was born in Oslo, Norway. In 1912, he moved to the United States. He was the US Ski Jumping Champion three times (1913, 1914 and 1917), and 1922 Canadian champion.

On 16 February 1913, his first year competing in the United States, he set a world record of 51.5 m (169 ft) on Curry Hill in Ironwood, Michigan, United States.

On 18 February 1916, he set another ski jumping world record at 58.5 m (192.9 ft) in Steamboat Springs, Colorado, where there is currently a restaurant named after him (Ragnar's). 

He competed in cross-country skiing and Nordic combined at the 1924 Winter Olympics in Chamonix. Ragnar was denied the opportunity to compete there in ski jumping, because a clerk forgot to submit his name to Olympic authorities. He was injured in 1924 while jumping, which ended his jumping career. He was elected into the National Ski Hall of Fame in 1967. He died in Florida in 1975.

Ski jumping world records

 Not recognized! Stood at world record distance, but achieved at professional championships.

References

External links
Ragnar's Steamboat Mountain Dining

1890 births
1975 deaths
Norwegian emigrants to the United States
American male Nordic combined skiers
American male ski jumpers
American male cross-country skiers
Olympic Nordic combined skiers of the United States
Olympic cross-country skiers of the United States
Nordic combined skiers at the 1924 Winter Olympics
Cross-country skiers at the 1924 Winter Olympics